Bhikha is a surname. Notable people with the surname include:

 Husmukh Bhikha (born 1958), New Zealand hockey player
 Zain Bhikha, South African singer-songwriter